John MacDonald Coleman (born February 21, 1958) is an American actor who has played the role of Steven Carrington in the 1980s prime time soap opera Dynasty (1982–1988), Noah Bennet in the science-fiction drama series Heroes (2006–2010), State Senator Robert Lipton on The Office (2010–2013), and United States Senator William Bracken on Castle (2012–2015).

Early life and education
Coleman was born February 21, 1958, in Easton, Pennsylvania, in the Lehigh Valley region of eastern Pennsylvania. He is a sixth-generation descendant of Benjamin Franklin. He attended Solebury School in Solesbury Township, Pennsylvania, and Duke University, where he decided to pursue acting as a career. After graduating from Duke in 1980, he attended Eugene O'Neill Theater Center in Waterford, Connecticut.

Career

Coleman's first major role was in Days of Our Lives, where he appeared from 1981 to 1982 as the character of Jake Kositchek (aka The Salem Strangler). He also made an appearance on Celebrity Bullseye.
In 1982, he joined the cast of Dynasty when he took over the role of Steven Carrington, one of the first gay characters on American television. Coleman played the role until the end of the show's eighth season in 1988.

He was a regular on the short-lived series Nightmare Cafe (1992), and appeared on the miniseries Kingdom Hospital (2004). He made guest appearances in The Net, CSI: Miami, Nip/Tuck, Without a Trace, Diagnosis: Murder, and Entourage. He co-starred as Alyson & Amanda Michalka's father in the Disney Channel Original Movie Cow Belles.

He was nominated for his performance in the play Stand-up Tragedy at the Mark Taper Forum, and won a Los Angeles Drama Critics Circle Award for his performance in Bouncers. He wrote the screenplays for Studio City, which he produced and acted in, and Can't Help Falling.

Coleman was a main cast member of science-fiction series Heroes, where he played Noah Bennet. Coleman states about portraying the character, "It's a combination of the light and dark. I don't want to just be a moustache twirling villain."

Coleman appeared in an episode of The Mentalist in October 2010. He played the role of a wealthy, arrogant murder suspect named Max Winter. He also played a patient named Joe Dugan (a campaign manager of a New Jersey senator) in the House episode of "Office Politics" in 2010.

In Hallmark Channel’s original movie Rock The House (2010), Jack Coleman played a lawyer named Max who finds a way to reconnect with his daughter and his old sense of joy when he gets back together with his music-making friends from his teenaged years. Starting in November 2010, Coleman had a recurring role on The Office as Pennsylvania State Senator Robert Lipton, the love interest for both Angela Martin (Angela Kinsey) and Oscar Martinez (Oscar Nunez). He has appeared in the episodes "WUPHF.com", "Classy Christmas", "Michael's Last Dundies","Goodbye, Michael", "Jury Duty", "Fundraiser", "Free Family Portrait Studio" "New Guys", "Here Comes Treble", "The Boat", "The Whale", "Customer Loyalty" and "Vandalism".

From 2011 to 2012, he played Bill Forbes on the third season of the CW drama The Vampire Diaries in the episodes "The Hybrid", "The End of the Affair", "Disturbing Behavior", "The Ties That Bind" and "Bringing Out The Dead". In 2011, he appeared on the CBS drama Criminal Minds, playing Bill Rogers, a serial rapist, in the episode "Hope". In July 2012, it was announced that Coleman joined the fifth season of Castle as a new antagonist for Stana Katic’s character Kate Beckett. He has appeared in the episodes "After the Storm", "Recoil", "In the Belly of the Beast", "Veritas", "XY", and "XX" playing Senator William H Bracken.

Coleman joined USA Network’s Burn Notice as a recurring part of the drama’s truncated (13-episode) seventh and final season. He played Andrew Strong, a ranking CIA officer who has seen it all. Noble, but also obsessive at times, Strong is a relentless taskmaster who pushes Michael (Jeffrey Donovan) to do whatever it takes to complete the mission.

In 2013, he played the closeted gay husband Daniel Douglas Langston of conservative Vice President Sally Langston on Scandal. In February 2014, he appeared in CSI: Crime Scene Investigation Season 14 Episode 15 – "Love for Sale". In 2015, he reprised his role as Noah Bennet in an "event miniseries" Heroes Reborn, which served as a continuation of the original Heroes storyline. In 2019, he starred in the movie version of Graham Farrow's award winning, critically acclaimed stage play 'Rattlesnakes'.

Personal life
Coleman married actress Beth Toussaint in 1996. They have a daughter, Tess, born in 1999.

Filmography

Film

Television

References

External links

 
 
 
 Jack Coleman Fansite
 Jack Coleman Livejournal Community
 Jack Coleman Facebook Fan Page

1958 births
Living people
Male actors from Pennsylvania
American male soap opera actors
American male stage actors
American male television actors
Duke University alumni
Writers from Easton, Pennsylvania
20th-century American male actors
21st-century American male actors